In mechanism design, implementability is a property of a social choice function. It means that there is an incentive-compatible mechanism that attains ("implements")
this function. There are several degrees of implementability, corresponding to the different degrees of incentive-compatibility, e.g:
 A function is dominant-strategy implementable if it is attainable by a mechanism which is dominant-strategy-incentive-compatible (also called strategyproof).
 A function is Bayesian-Nash implementable if it is attainable by a mechanism which is Bayesian-Nash-incentive-compatible.
See  for a recent reference. In some textbooks, the entire field of mechanism design is called Implementation theory.

References 

Mechanism design